Brynhild Berge (later Samuelsen, 22 September 1901 – 22 February 1975) was a Norwegian diver who competed in the 1920 Summer Olympics. She was born in Kristiania and died in Bodø. In 1920 she was eliminated in the first round of the 10 metre platform competition.

References

External links
profile

1901 births
1975 deaths
Norwegian female divers
Olympic divers of Norway
Divers at the 1920 Summer Olympics
Sportspeople from Oslo